Gymnothorax enigmaticus, the enigmatic moray, tiger moray or banded moray, is a moray eel found in coral reefs in the Pacific and Indian oceans. It was first named by McCosker and Randall in 1982,

References

External links
 Fishes of Australia : Gymnothorax enigmaticus

enigmaticus
Marine fish of Northern Australia
Fish described in 1982